Lahej Al-Nofali (Arabic:لاحج النوفلي) (born 15 April 1990) is an Emirati footballer. He currently plays for Hatta as a midfielder.

External links

References

Emirati footballers
1990 births
Living people
Baniyas Club players
Dibba Al-Hisn Sports Club players
Al Urooba Club players
Hatta Club players
Shabab Al-Ahli Club players
UAE First Division League players
UAE Pro League players
Association football midfielders